The Mississippi Gulf Coast, also known as Mississippi Coast, Mississippi Gulf Coast region, Coastal Mississippi, and The Coast, is the area of Mississippi along the Mississippi Sound at the northern extreme of the Gulf of Mexico.

Geography
At the state's creation, Hancock and Jackson were the only two counties to make up this region. However, before the end of the first centennial, subdivisions in the counties lead to the formation of Harrison County, as well as the pineywoods counties of Pearl River, Stone and George.

Cities 
The Mississippi Gulf Coast consists of many cities that lie directly on the Mississippi Sound. The U. S. Census Bureau divided the Metropolitan Statistical Area (MSA) for the Mississippi Gulf Coast in 2003, which previously consisted of the three coastal counties (Hancock; Harrison; Jackson), into two MSAs that included two additional counties (George; Stone). Cities in the new Metropolitan Statistical Area include the original French settlements Biloxi and Ocean Springs, as well as Waveland, Bay St. Louis, Diamondhead, Pass Christian, Long Beach, Gulfport, D'Iberville, Gautier, Pascagoula, Moss Point, Lucedale, and Wiggins.

History

Early History 
The Biloxi people lived in the region at least as early as 1699.

Colonial History 

In 1699, Pierre Le Moyne d'Iberville arrived to establish a colony near the mouth of the Mississippi River. He landed on the Ship Island, and three days later, arrived on the Mississippi Gulf Coast, establishing a colony and building Fort Maurepas, which served as the first capital of French Louisiana. The fort became a base of operations to continue exploring the area.

The French settlers found the area to be difficult to maintain a settlement. According to Bunn & Williams (2007), factors such as death of crops, lack of fresh water, lack of discipline, and illness led to difficulty in maintaining the colonization of the area. Furthermore, due to political concerns, the capital of French Louisiana was moved to Mobile in 1701; the fort was abandoned by 1702. Despite a temporary move of the capital to Biloxi during the construction of New Orleans, previous failures kept the area from playing a further role in French colonization efforts in the region.

Statehood and Antebellum Period 
When Mississippi entered the Union in 1817, the majority of the population lived in Northern parts of the state. At statehood, the population of the coast comprised 2.5% of the state's total. Likewise, the Census lists only 586 of the state's 30,061 slaves as living on the Mississippi Gulf Coast. After statehood, the coastal regions remained a frontier, with cultural influences coming from the Mediterranean area. According to Kenneth P'Pool, deputy historic preservation officer at MDAH, "The Coast's situation along ... the Gulf of Mexico — both facilitated the region's ethnic diversity and maintained its ties to the rest of the world much more easily than was possible for other regions of [Mississippi]."

Civil War 
Fort Massachusetts, on Ship Island, was seized during the American Civil War.

Twentieth century 

In the 20th century, Keesler Air Force Base brought development to the region. Hurricane Camille on August 17, 1969, and Hurricane Katrina on August 29, 2005 caused historic destruction to the Gulf Coast.
Originally dubbed "America's Riviera", the Mississippi Gulf Coast gained prominence in the early 1900's as a gambling and tourist mecca, an alternative to Florida as a warm, actively fun area with gaming (although illegal at the time, it was allowed at certain resorts) and home to the longest manmade beach in the world.  Golfing also became a strong draw to snowbirds looking to play their game of choice all year long.
During the early 90's, gaming was made legal in the two coastal counties of Harrison and Hancock.  This brought a new era of growth with Vegas style gaming hotel and casinos; along with this, condo towers started to dot the coast as it became the 2nd largest gaming area in the US based on gaming space alone.  After a brief disruption brought on by Hurricane Katrina, the Mississippi Gulf Coast bounced back quickly, even faster than New Orleans, despite massive destruction.

Education

As of May 2019, there are 126 K-12 schools spread across 16 school districts, which serve students in the Mississippi Gulf Coast region. 

In addition, the Mississippi Gulf Coast Community College offers associate degree and career programs. The University of Southern Mississippi has a branch located in Long Beach, Mississippi which offers undergraduate and graduate degree programs.

Notable people
 Walter Inglis Anderson, painter, writer, and naturalist
 Frederick Barthelme, novelist
 Varina Davis, First Lady of the Confederate States of America
 Prentiss Ingraham, Confederate soldier and writer
 Jack Nelson, Pulitzer Prize winning journalist of the Civil Rights era
 George E. Ohr, ceramic artist
 Eugene Antonio Marino, Archbishop emeritus of Atlanta
 Fannie C. Williams, educator
 William Woodward, artist
 Robin Roberts, ABC News anchor
 Devin Booker, NBA Shooting Guard
 Brett Favre, NFL Quarterback
 Brittney Reese, Olympic Long Jumper
 Mahmoud Abdul-Rauf, aka Chris Wayne Jackson, former NBA Player

See also
 Land Trust for the Mississippi Coastal Plain
 
 Mississippi Gulf Coast National Heritage Area

Notes

References 

Geography of Mississippi
Gulf Coast of the United States
Gulf Coast
Geography of George County, Mississippi
Geography of Hancock County, Mississippi
Geography of Harrison County, Mississippi
Geography of Jackson County, Mississippi
Geography of Pearl River County, Mississippi
Geography of Stone County, Mississippi
West Florida